Pathiri (pronounced ) is a pancake made of rice flour. It is part of the local cuisine among the Mappilas  of Malabar region in Kerala State of Southern India. 

Today, pathiri is still a popular dish among the Muslims in Kerala.

Poricha Pathiri
Poricha pathiri or Fried pathiri is a tasty dish that could be enjoyed as an evening snack

See also

 Kinnathappam
 Kalathappam
 Alsa
 Pashti
 Cuisine of Kerala
 Arab Influence on Kerala: Malik ibn Dinar
 List of Indian breads

References

External links

Flatbreads
Indian breads
Indian rice dishes
Kerala cuisine
Pancakes
Rice breads